K.Rayapuram  is a village in the Arimalam revenue block of Pudukkottai district, Tamil Nadu, India.

Demographics 

As per the 2001 census, K.Rayavaram had a total population of 4262 with 1980 males and 2282 females. Out of the total  
population 2686 people were literate.

References

Villages in Pudukkottai district